Demosthenes (384–322 BC) was a prominent Greek statesman and orator of ancient Athens.

Demosthenes may also refer to:
 Demosthenes (general), Athenian general
 Demosthenes Philalethes, ancient physician
 Demosthenes the Laconian, Olympic winner in 316 BC
 George Savalas or Demosthenes, actor who appeared on Kojak
 Valentine Wiggin or Demosthenes, a character in Ender's Game
 Demóstenes (footballer) (1892–1961), Demóstenes Correia de Syllos, Brazilian footballer

See also
 Demosthenian Literary Society, a society at the University of Georgia in Athens, Georgia, United States